The Central American Championships in Athletics (Campeonatos Centroamericanos Mayores) is an athletics event organized by the Confederación Atlética del Istmo Centroamericano CADICA (Central American Isthmus Athletic Confederation) open for athletes from member associations.

Team ranking
There is an overall winner in the team ranking based on points awarded for the athlete's placings.  Moreover, there are winners in team ranking in the men's and women's categories.  The point system changed over the years.  In the early years, points were awarded for athletes on the first 6 places (6 points for the 1st place, 5 points for the 2nd place, ..., 1 point for the 6th place). Starting in the mid 70ths, points were awarded for athletes on the first 8 places (9 points for the 1st place, 7 points for the 2nd place, ..., 1 point for the 8th place). From 2009 on, points were only awarded for athletes on the first 4 places (5 points for the 1st place, 3 points for the 2nd place, 2 points for the 3rd place, and 1 point for the 4th place).

Editions
The following list was compiled from the CADICA website, and from a variety of articles from the archive of
Costa Rican newspaper La Nación, and Guatemalan newspaper Prensa Libre.

See also
List of Central American Championships records

References

External links
CADICA website (in Spanish)

 
Recurring sporting events established in 1958
Athletics